The District is an American crime drama and police procedural television series which aired on CBS from October 7, 2000, to May 1, 2004. The show followed the work and personal life of the chief of Washington, D.C.'s police department.

Premise
Former Newark, New Jersey Police Commissioner and New York Transit police officer Jack Mannion is hired as the chief of the bureaucracy-laden Washington, D.C. police force. Together with his detectives and allies he must fight crime as well as internal corruption and the powers of Congress in order to reorganize and renovate the force.

Production
The District was inspired by the real-life experience of former New York City Deputy Police Commissioner Jack Maple. Along with Police Commissioner William Bratton, he had reorganized the NYPD, and one of the achievements was the CompStat program (comparative statistics), which has its own major role in the TV series. After the success in New York, the CompStat program has been adapted by other cities. However Jack Maple himself chose to publish his experiences—along with Chris Mitchell he wrote a book (The Crime Fighter, 2000), and along with Terry George he prepared a TV series concept. His impact on the storyline after season 1 was limited; he died of colon cancer on August 4, 2001.

Primary filming was in Los Angeles, with some location shooting in Washington, D.C.

Episodes

Cast and characters

Main

Recurring

Cast notes 
 In 2001, Jean Smart was nominated for an Emmy Award for "Outstanding Guest Actress in a Drama Series" for her performance as "Sherry Regan".
 On March 12, 2003, Thigpen died of a cerebral hemorrhage in her Marina del Rey, California, home. The show's third-season finale had a tribute to her character.

Ratings

 
Note: Throughout The District's entire run it was aired in a Saturday night timeslot and also it was the last U.S. scripted series to air on its Saturday night schedule until Ransom debuted in 2017.

International broadcasts
In Australia, The District aired on the Nine Network in late night slots throughout its run.
In Bulgaria, the first two seasons aired on Nova Television. The whole series was aired on AXN with subtitles and later on AXN Crime. Later Fox Crime repeated the first two seasons and the dub was rerecorded with the same actors. The third season started in October 2010.
In Sweden, The District airs Monday through Thursday at 12:30am on TV4.
In Poland, The District aired on the Universal Channel.
In Germany, The District airs on VOX.
In the United Kingdom, it airs on CBS Action. It was also previously broadcast in late night slots on ITV1.
In Serbia, it aired on Radio Television of Serbia.
In Slovenia, it aired on the now defunct Prva TV, later it aired on Fox Life (Bulgaria & Balkans region).
In Jamaica, The District airs on CVM TV, every Thursday At approx. 12:00 a.m. as of April 2012.
In Romania it aired on TVR1 and TVR2
In Italy it aired on Rai 2 on November 29, 2004 and replayed on La7 on May 25, 2009.
In France, The District airs on France 2 (Washington Police)

Syndication
It ran for a time on USA Network as well as on The Biography Channel after cancellation. On February 7, 2020 it joined the day shift in the Friday slot on Heroes & Icons. Without explanation as of Feb. 20, 2020 the program was pulled and Fridays reverted to NUMB3RS.
As of mid-2020 it is back on the Heroes and Icons TV schedule weekdays from 1AM to 3AM Eastern Standard Time.

References

External links
 
 
 USA Network site (Archived copy)
 CBS Network site (Archived copy)

2000 American television series debuts
2004 American television series endings
2000s American crime drama television series
2000s American police procedural television series
CBS original programming
Television series by CBS Studios
Television series by Universal Television
Television shows set in Washington, D.C.
Montgomery County, Maryland in fiction